Rex White (born August 17, 1929) is a retired auto racer and NASCAR champion. White was one of the drivers who competed for the original Chevrolet racing team.  He began racing in 1956, grabbing fourteen top-ten finishes. After a part-time run in 1957, White won twice in 1958. His most notable year came in 1960, when he won six races, and the NASCAR Grand National Series championship. When he retired in 1964, he had acquired 28 career victories.  Throughout most of White's NASCAR career, he drove General Motors brand cars, typically painted gold and white, sporting the number "4" on the side.  After he retired, White was inducted into the National Motorsports Press Association (NMPA) Hall of Fame in 1974, and was named one of NASCAR's 50 Greatest Drivers in 1998.

Personal life 
White was born on August 17, 1929, and raised in Taylorsville, North Carolina.  White said that at the age of eight, he was working on his family's Model T.  "I was unaware the car on which I labored represented hope to people around me, frustration to those trying to stop illegal moonshine. I saw automobiles as transportation, not the symbol of an upcoming billion-dollar sport."  White was born during the Great Depression, and suffered from polio as a young boy  The polio left one leg withered, but when speaking about it White said: "Most of the lessons I have learned have stayed with me all my life. The biggest one was how to conquer fear."  Rex learned how to drive by piloting a neighbor's truck in the fields where he lived when he was 6 years old, and often pretended to drive while sitting in the family Model T, imagining that he was on a race track.  White's looks have at times been compared to those of comedian George Gobel.

Racing career 
In 1954 White got his first car when one of his wife's relatives helped him scrape together the $600 he needed for an old 1937 Ford. Within a year he was making enough at the race-tracks to survive. White ran his first race in the Sportsman division at West Lanham Speedway in Maryland. He was forced to drop out of the race due to engine problems. By the time the season was over, White, as a rookie, had won the Sportsman championship at the 1/5-mile high-banked oval.

NASCAR 

Rex White started racing in NASCAR in 1956, when the premier stock-car racing sport was known as the Grand National division.  He started 24 races in 1956 and finished in the top 10 on 14 occasions, as well as finishing second in the final NASCAR Short Track standings, a lower division of the NASCAR Grand Nationals.

White competed in only 9 of 53 events in 1957; but finished in the top 10 in six of those events, with four of those finishes being in the top 5.

In 1958 White moved from Washington to Spartanburg in order to join forces with Louis Clements, his friend, partner, and chief mechanic. White and Clements proceeded to build their first late-model Chevy, and started competing together in the NASCAR circuit. They met a year or so earlier when both were working for Chevrolet's factory racing team, an enterprise that retired from racing in June 1957, when Detroit and Chevy temporarily withdrew its financial backing to the industry.  White competed a total of 22 times of the 55 races that year, winning his first NASCAR race at the season-opening event at the Champion Speedway in Fayetteville, NC.

At the age of 29, White ran in 23 of 44 NASCAR races, winning five times and capturing five pole positions.  He finished the season with 11 top 5s and 13 top 10 finishes.

White's first and only championship came in 1960, and his first win of the season occurred in the ninth event of the season.  Through the remainder of the season, White won 6 more of his 28 career victories.  White finished outside the top 10 in finishing position only 5 times throughout the 40 starts of that 1960 season, winning the championship.  By the end of that 1960 season, he also notched the Most Popular Driver Award, and the Driver of the Year awards.  White, in his gold and white 1960 chevy, secured his championship just prior to the season-ending Atlanta 500 mile event.  White's championship hopes improved dramatically in the inaugural World 600 (now named the Coca-Cola 600), when his chief rivals, Richard Petty, Junior Johnson, Lee Petty, and three other drivers were disqualified for not making a proper entrance to pit road at the Charlotte Motor Speedway.  White eventually finished the 600-mile event in sixth place.  White's check for winning the 1960 NASCAR championship totaled $13,000.

In 1961 White won seven races, and finished second in points.  He competed in a total of 47 of 55 events that year, and notched a total of 29 top 5s, and a career best 39 top 10 finishes.

White competed in 37 events throughout the 1962 season, winning a career-best 8 times, and finished the season fifth in points.  When reflecting back on his racing career, White considered his victory at the 1962 Atlanta speedway one of his best:  "My best finish was over Marvin Panch in the 4 car right here in Atlanta in the 1962 Dixie 400. The last fuel stop was out of sequence and my crew chief put on the pit board that he questioned my gas. ... So I knew we weren't going to make it to the end without fueling. I hung on to Marvin and just drafted. He ran out of gas with two laps to go, and I went all the way to the bank."

In 1963 White was unable to win a race for the first time since the 1957 season, but still managed to finish ninth in points, and notch 14 more top 10 finishes.  From 1959 through the 1963 season, White won more races (28) than any other driver; including legends Lee and Richard Petty, Ned Jarrett, Fireball Roberts, Junior Johnson, Curtis Turner, Joe Weatherly and Buck Baker.

White was known for running up front even if he did not finish. He was also recognized as one of the first drivers to focus on the goal of the Grand National Series title. Despite racing without substantial backing, he captured 36 poles and had total of 28 career victories in 233 starts.  White finished in the top-10 in the point standings six of the nine years he competed in NASCAR's Grand National Series.

NASCAR career statistics 

Data as of March 2008

Legacy 
Standing only five feet, four inches (1.6m) and weighing 135 pounds, Rex White was the smallest man to ever capture the NASCAR championship as of 2021.  After 10 years and over 36,000 miles of racing in 233 races, White accumulated 28 wins, 110 top-5 finishes, and 163 top 10 finishes.  White is considered by NASCAR as one of its top 50 drivers, a winner of the Living Legends of Auto Racing Pioneers awards, and the Smokey Yunick Pioneer award.  White is also a member of the National Motorsports Press Association Hall of Fame at Darlington, and the Georgia Automobile Racing Hall of Fame.

White's 163 top 10 finishes in 233 races, which calculates to about 70%, is unlikely to be topped due to the parity and longevity of today's drivers.  Only Tim Flock comes close to such record numbers.

White authored his autobiography titled Gold Thunder, and teamed with editor Ann Jones for a second book covering 58 memoirs of past and present NASCAR legends titled All Around The Track.

In January 2015 White was selected as an inductee to the NASCAR Hall of Fame.  At the time, White was NASCAR's "oldest living champion at 85 years of age". White retains that title at age 93 as of 2022.

Rex White Motorsports Memorial Plaza - Home to 5Wkids Outdoor Learning Area is located at the former Augusta International Raceway that is being developed into Diamond Lakes Regional Park in Hephzibah, Georgia.

Motorsports career results

NASCAR
(key) (Bold – Pole position awarded by qualifying time. Italics – Pole position earned by points standings or practice time. * – Most laps led. ** – All laps led.)

Grand National Series

Daytona 500

Further reading 

 National Motorsports Press Association
 Rex White
 Chevrolet Brings Back Its Champion
 Gold Thunder at Google Book Search
 Rex White Racing

References

External links 

Legends of NASCAR bio

1929 births
Living people
NASCAR Cup Series champions
NASCAR drivers
People from Taylorsville, North Carolina
Racing drivers from North Carolina
NASCAR Hall of Fame inductees